Editum is a genus of moths of the family Erebidae erected by Michael Fibiger in 2010.

Species
Editum editoides Fibiger, 2010
Editum editum Fibiger, 2010

References

Micronoctuini
Noctuoidea genera